Southport is an electoral district of the Legislative Assembly in the Australian state of Queensland.

The district is based in the northern part of the Gold Coast. It is named for the suburb of Southport, and also includes the suburbs of Arundel, Labrador, Molendinar and Parkwood. It was first created for the 1977 election.

An earlier district based in the same region was also called Southport. It existed from 1950 to 1960.

Members for Southport

Election results

References

External links
 

Electoral districts of Queensland